Conrad Ecklie is a fictional character on the television series CSI played by Marc Vann.  He was employed as Assistant Director of the crime lab of Clark County, Nevada and dayshift counterpart of Gilbert Grissom, he eventually left the crime lab altogether and became Undersheriff in Season 9, then elected Sheriff of Clark County in Season 13. In earlier seasons, he is a typical antagonist of Grissom's team. As the series progresses, he gradually starts to become a good friend to the CSI team, at one point even showing remorse for his earlier behavior.

Fictional character biography
Ecklie is a former day shift supervisor, promoted to Assistant Director in Season 5. He is known for his strict adherence to regulations, and takes on more of the role of a bureaucrat and politician. He also appears to be quite ambitious and career-minded and a vigorous self-promoter; thus, he has received praise from senior city and county officials on several occasions.  Ecklie and night shift supervisor Gil Grissom have a very rocky relationship throughout the series, with Grissom claiming Ecklie is more concerned with advancement than evidence, and Ecklie maintaining that Grissom shows favoritism toward his subordinates. Grissom's animosity toward Ecklie is shared by several other members of the night shift, including Sara Sidle, who was nearly fired for insubordination when she yelled at Ecklie ("The only reason this is your lab, is because Grissom doesn't kiss ass"). Catherine Willows, though not an admirer of Ecklie's, has criticized Grissom on several occasions because his indifference to office politics has allowed the more ambitious Ecklie to advance beyond him. In addition to earning him promotions, Ecklie's political skills have prompted favorable comparison over Grissom by superiors, some of whom feel Grissom is an occasionally inefficient investigator.  Part of Ecklie's distaste for Grissom seem to stem from his belief Grissom is as career-minded as he is. As such, Ecklie often assumes Grissom's requests for delays or equipment are attempts to sabotage him and does not appear to have qualms about retaliating, although this seems to have ended from season 6 onwards.

In part to spite Grissom, Ecklie split the night shift CSI team in the middle of season 5 and made Willows the swing shift supervisor, ignoring her repeated requests for transfer to day shift. In addition, he effectively demoted his former subordinate Sofia Curtis by transferring her into Grissom's team instead of making her acting supervisor position permanent.  To the viewer, the decision is seen as being spiteful rather than Curtis being inadequate in her current position when she sides with Grissom as a quality investigator after Ecklie called Grissom's forensic abilities into question; as Ecklie demotes her, he implies she would get along better with Grissom.

Despite animosity, Ecklie put aside all differences in the season 5 finale "Grave Danger" and helped the team locate and rescue a kidnapped Nick Stokes, putting his skills as a bureaucrat toward the task by showing his superiors ways in which the department could generate the required ransom.  Since that time, Ecklie no longer seems to view Grissom as a threat to his position and his relationship with Grissom and the team, while not friendly per se, has become collegial.

In the season 9 episode "For Warrick", Ecklie attends Warrick Brown's funeral, but unlike the other CSI characters who become emotional over Warrick's death, Ecklie remains stoic the entire time. In "One to Go..." Ecklie has been promoted to Undersheriff after McKeen's arrest for Warrick's murder.

Although Ecklie's personal life is hardly touched on throughout his sporadic appearances in the CSI series, it was revealed in the season 2 episode, "Anatomy of a Lye", that he had bought a Mercedes from Gil Grissom five years prior; as Grissom complained. In the season 5 episode "Iced", he says he is divorced and allergic to cats.  However, these statements may not have been true; at the time he answered, he was under pressure from the inquiring people (a flirtatious woman and Al Robbins, respectively). In the episode "Cello and Goodbye" it is revealed that Ecklie has a daughter, Morgan Brody, who works as a member of the Los Angeles Police Department's Scientific Investigation Division. It is also revealed that his ex-wife remarried and his daughter has chosen to use her stepfather's last name.  Morgan recently resigned from her post in Los Angeles and joined the LVPD CSI team, much to her father's dismay.

Conrad was shot down in the 12th-season finale but survived in Season 13.

In Season 13, Conrad becomes the Clark County Sheriff.

See also
List of CSI: Crime Scene Investigation characters

External links
 Conrad Ecklie at Crimelab.NL

CSI: Crime Scene Investigation characters
Fictional Las Vegas Police Department detectives
Fictional sheriffs
Television characters introduced in 2000